The 100 metre freestyle is often considered to be the highlight (Blue Ribbon event) of the sport of swimming, like 100 metres in the sport of Athletics.

The first swimmer to break the one-minute barrier (long course) was Johnny Weissmuller, in 1922. The current world records holders are David Popovici (August 13, 2022) and Sarah Sjöström (since 2017).

Australian Dawn Fraser won the event a record three times at the Olympics, and she is the only woman to win it more than once. Four men, American Duke Kahanamoku, Weissmuller, Russian Alexander Popov, and Dutchman Pieter van den Hoogenband won the event at the Olympics twice. Popov was also world champion (held since 1973) three times.

Men's champions

Olympic Games

World Championships

Women's champions

Olympic Games

World Championships

See also
Freestyle swimming
World record progression 100 metres freestyle

References

External links
Swimming Men's 100 metres Freestyle Medalists at Sports-Reference
History of the Men's 100-Meter Freestyle at the Olympic Games

100 metres freestyle
Freestyle swimming